Altmark is an electoral constituency (German: Wahlkreis) represented in the Bundestag. It elects one member via first-past-the-post voting. Under the current constituency numbering system, it is designated as constituency 66. It is located in northern Saxony-Anhalt, comprising the districts of Altmarkkreis Salzwedel and Stendal.

Altmark was created for the inaugural 1990 federal election after German reunification. Since 2021, it has been represented by Herbert Wollmann of the Social Democratic Party (SPD).

Geography
Altmark is located in northern Saxony-Anhalt. As of the 2021 federal election, it comprises the districts of Altmarkkreis Salzwedel and Stendal.

History
Altmark was created after German reunification in 1990. In the 1990 through 1998 elections, it was constituency 283 in the numbering system. In the 2002 and 2005 elections, it was number 66. In the 2009 election, it was number 67. Since the 2013 election, it has been number 66.

Originally, the constituency comprised the districts of Salzwedel, Stendal, Osterburg, Gardelegen, and Klötze. It acquired its current configuration and borders in the 2002 election.

Members
The constituency was first represented by Rudolf Karl Krause of the Christian Democratic Union (CDU), who served from 1990 to 1994. Reinhard Weis of the Social Democratic Party (SPD) was elected in 1994 and served until 2005, followed by Marko Mühlstein until 2009. In 2009, Katrin Kunert of The Left won the constituency and served a single term. Jörg Hellmuth of the CDU was elected in 2013, followed by Eckhard Gnodtke in 2017. Herbert Wollmann regained it for the SPD in 2021.

Election results

2021 election

2017 election

2013 election

2009 election

References

Federal electoral districts in Saxony-Anhalt
1990 establishments in Germany
Constituencies established in 1990